"The Enemy Inside" is the first single from progressive metal/rock band Dream Theater's eponymous 12th studio album. It was announced on the band's official Facebook page as the first single on August 3, 2013 and was made available by USA Today for streaming on August 5. A  for the song was published on the band's YouTube channel a day later.

There is a music video for the song which shows a returning war veteran suffering from post-traumatic stress disorder. It is notable as Dream Theater's first music video to not feature any of the band members.

On December 6, 2013, it was announced that "The Enemy Inside" was nominated for the "Best Metal Performance" Grammy Award, coming in second to Black Sabbath's "God Is Dead?"

Track list

Save A Warrior 
During filming the music video to "The Enemy Inside", Dream Theater were connected to Save A Warrior, an organization dedicated to embracing returning war veterans and offering safe, innovative evidence-based resiliency programs for soldiers suffering from post-traumatic stress disorder. The band has worked closely to the organization.

Personnel
James LaBrie - lead vocals
John Petrucci - guitar, backing vocals, producer
John Myung - bass
Jordan Rudess - keyboards
Mike Mangini - drums, percussion

See also
List of Dream Theater songs

References

External links
Official Dream Theater website
Official Dream Theater Facebook page

2013 singles
Dream Theater songs
Roadrunner Records singles
Songs written by John Petrucci
2013 songs
Songs written by John Myung